Platinum(IV) bromide is the inorganic compound with the formula PtBr4. It is a brown solid.  It is a little-used compound mainly of interest for academic research. It is a component of a reagent used in qualitative inorganic analysis.

In terms of structure, the compound is an inorganic polymer consisting of interconnected PtBr6 octahedra.

References

Bromides,4
Bromides
Platinum group halides